In mathematics, a topological space  is a D-space if for any family  of open sets such that  for all points , there is a closed discrete subset  of the space  such that .

History 

The notion of D-spaces was introduced by Eric Karel van Douwen and E.A. Michael. It first appeared in a 1979 paper by van Douwen and Washek Frantisek Pfeffer in the Pacific Journal of Mathematics. Whether every Lindelöf and regular topological space is a D-space  is known as the D-space problem. This problem is among twenty of the most important problems of set theoretic topology.

Properties 
 Every Menger space is a D-space.
 A subspace of a topological linearly ordered space is a D-space iff it is a paracompact space.

References

Properties of topological spaces
Topology